A Satellite Landing Ground (SLG) is a type of British Royal Air Force (RAF) aviation facility that typically consists of an airfield with one or two grass runways which is designed throughout to be hidden from aerial observation by blending into forests and other natural features to hide the presence of aircraft and associated buildings. The landing grounds were mainly used by RAF Maintenance Units (MU) which used the areas to disperse aircraft to reduce the likelihood of attacks from the air. Some improvements and upgrades to aircraft were performed at these sites but overall it was kept to a minimum. Some support buildings came about by using requisitioned buildings on the land.

A satellite station is not the same as a Satellite Landing Ground.

Satellite Landing Grounds

References

Citations

Bibliography

Royal Air Force stations
Royal Air Force satellite landing grounds